Boothville is an unincorporated community and census-designated place in Plaquemines Parish, Louisiana, United States. Its population was 854 as of the 2010 census, and 718 at the 2020 U.S. census.

Jeré Longman of The New York Times stated that before Hurricane Katrina in 2005 the community served as "a hub of the fishing and oil and gas industries."

History

Boothville was named for Colonel Booth, a landowner.

Demographics

Education
Plaquemines Parish School Board operates the public schools of the parish.

It is served by Boothville-Venice Elementary School in Boothville and South Plaquemines High School in Buras. Prior to 2005 Boothville-Venice High School (PreK-12) served the community, but Hurricane Katrina damaged the original building.

Plaquemines Parish is in the service area of Nunez Community College.

References

External links
 Boothville-Venice Elementary School

Census-designated places in Plaquemines Parish, Louisiana
Census-designated places in Louisiana
Unincorporated communities in Plaquemines Parish, Louisiana
Unincorporated communities in Louisiana
Louisiana populated places on the Mississippi River
Populated coastal places in Louisiana
Census-designated places in New Orleans metropolitan area